This article contains information about the literary events and publications of 1759.

Events
By January 15 – Voltaire's satirical novel Candide, ou l'Optimisme is published simultaneously in five countries.
January 15 – The British Museum opens in London.
March 5 – Denis Diderot's Encyclopédie is proscribed by the Vatican and temporarily suppressed by the French government. The ban is lifted in September to allow publication of a revised version.
July 27 – The earliest known professional performance of Shakespeare's Hamlet in North America (in Garrick's version) is given by the American Company in Philadelphia, with Lewis Hallam Jr. as Hamlet.
August 12 – In the Seven Years' War Battle of Kunersdorf, the German poet Major Ewald Christian von Kleist is fatally injured.
December – Laurence Sterne has the first two volumes of his comic metafictional novel The Life and Opinions of Tristram Shandy, Gentleman printed in York, in a shop owned by Ann Ward.
December 22 – The writer and critic William Warburton is nominated Anglican Bishop of Gloucester.
unknown dates
Rev. Hugh Blair begins to teach a course on the principles of literary composition at the University of Edinburgh, the first held in the field of English literature.
Johann Ernst Immanuel Walch becomes a professor of rhetoric and poetry at the University of Jena.

New books

Fiction
Anonymous – The History of Some of the Penitents in the Magdalen-House (dated 1760)
Sarah Fielding – The History of the Countess of Dellwyn
Samuel Johnson – The History of Rasselas, Prince of Abissinia (on Wikisource).
Gotthold Lessing – Fables
Madame Riccoboni – Lettres de Milady Juliette Catesby
William Rider – Candidus (translation of Candide)
Laurence Sterne – The Life and Opinions of Tristram Shandy, Gentleman, vols 1–2
Voltaire – Candide

Drama
William Hawkins – Cymbeline (adapted from William Shakespeare)
Arthur Murphy – The Orphan of China
James Townley – High Life Below Stairs

Poetry

Samuel Butler – The Genuine Remains (collected works)
Edward Capell – Prolusions
John Gilbert Cooper – Ver-Vert (transl.)
William Mason – Caractacus
Augustus Montague Toplady – Poems on Sacred Subjects

Non-fiction
Franz Aepinus – Tentamen Theoriae Electricitatis et Magnetismi (An Attempt at a Theory of Electricity and Magnetism)
Edmund Burke – The Annual Register
Angélique du Coudray – Abrégé de l'art des accouchements (The Art of Obstetrics)
Alexander Gerard – An Essay on Taste
Oliver Goldsmith 
The Bee (periodical solely by Goldsmith)
An Enquiry into the Present State of Polite Learning in Europe
David Hume – The History of England, Under the House of Tudor
Richard Hurd – Moral and Political Dialogues
Edward Hyde, 1st Earl of Clarendon – The Life of Edward Earl of Clarendon Written by Himself
Rai Chatar Man Kayath – Chahar Gulshan
William Robertson – The History of Scotland during the Reigns of Queen Mary and of King James
Adam Smith – The Theory of Moral Sentiments
Arthur Young – Reflections on the Present State of Affairs at Home and Abroad
Edward Young – Conjectures on Original Composition

Births
January 25 – Robert Burns, Scottish poet writing in Braid Scots and English (died 1796)
March 5 – John Jamieson, Scottish lexicographer (died 1838)
March 29 – Alexander Chalmers, Scottish biographer and editor (died 1834)
April 27 – Mary Wollstonecraft, English political writer and advocate of women's rights (died 1797)
May 4 (baptism) – Isabella Kelly, Scottish novelist and poet (died 1857)
June 17 – Helen Maria Williams, English novelist, poet and translator from French (died 1827)
October 13 – Mary Hays, English writer and advocate of women's rights (died 1843)
November 10 – Friedrich Schiller, German poet and dramatist (died 1805)
December 25 – Richard Porson, English classicist (died 1808)
unknown date – Deen Mahomet, author of first book in English by an Indian (died 1851)

Deaths
June 12 – William Collins, English poet (born 1721)
June 26 – Arthur Young, English religious writer and cleric (born 1693)
July 27 – Pierre Louis Maupertuis, French philosopher (born 1698)
July 29 – Kata Bethlen, Hungarian memoirist and correspondent (born 1700)
August 16 – Eugene Aram, English philologist and murderer, hanged (born 1704)
August 24 – Ewald Christian von Kleist, German poet (born 1715)
September 5 – Lauritz de Thurah, Danish architectural historian (born 1706)
October 7 – Joseph Ames, English bibliographer and antiquary (born 1680)
unknown date – Francis Coventry, clergyman and novelist (born 1725)
probable – Anton Wilhelm Amo, West African-born German philosopher (born 1703)

References

 
Years of the 18th century in literature